Always Never the Same is the nineteenth studio album released on March 2, 1999 by American country music singer George Strait. The album produced the singles "Meanwhile", "Write This Down", and "What Do You Say to That", which respectively reached #4, #1, and #4 on the Billboard Hot Country Singles & Tracks (now Hot Country Songs) charts in 1999. The title track, "One of You" and "I Look at You" also charted in the lower regions of that chart from unsolicited airplay.

Track listing

Personnel
As listed in liner notes.

Musicians
 Eddie Bayers – drums
 Stuart Duncan – fiddle
 Paul Franklin – steel guitar
 Steve Gibson – acoustic guitar, electric guitar
 Liana Manis – background vocals
 Brent Mason – electric guitar, acoustic guitar
 Steve Nathan – piano, Wurlitzer electric piano
 Randy Scruggs – acoustic guitar on "Meanwhile" & "What Do You Say to That"
 George Strait – lead vocals
 Glenn Worf – bass guitar
 Curtis Young – background vocals
Strings by The Nashville String Machine conducted and arranged by Bergen White.

Production
 Chuck Ainlay – Engineer
 Don Cobb – digital editing
 Tony Green – 2nd Engineer
 Carlos Grier – digital editing
 Russ Martin – Overdubs
 Justin Niebank – Overdubs
 Jessie Noble – project coordinator
 Denny Purcell – Masters
 Mark Ralston – 2nd Engineer
 Tim Waters – 2nd Engineer

Design
 Virginia Team - art direction
 Chris Ferrara - design
 Mark Tucker - photography

Charts

Weekly charts

Year-end charts

References

1999 albums
George Strait albums
MCA Records albums
Albums produced by Tony Brown (record producer)